Saltchuk is a family of transportation and distribution companies headquartered in Seattle, WA, US. , Puget Sound Business Journal listed it as the largest family owned business in Washington state, with 2016 revenues of $2.65 billion, employment of 919 in Washington and an additional 4,761 employees elsewhere in the world.

Throughout North America, Saltchuk companies provide air cargo, marine services, energy distribution, domestic shipping, international shipping, and logistics.

Lines of business
Saltchuk is organized in six lines of business that are responsible for the operation and growth of a related portfolio of businesses:

 Saltchuk Marine 
 Saltchuk Logistics
 Saltchuk Aviation
 NorthStar Energy
 TOTE
 Tropical

Regions served 
Saltchuk stated goal is "building the best family of transportation and distribution companies in North America." Saltchuk companies specialize in serving non-contiguous regions of the country by having operational density in key US Markets, in particular Alaska, Washington, Hawaii and Florida/Caribbean markets.

Alaska

Across Alaska, Saltchuk companies provide fuel and cargo transportation. Saltchuk collectively is one of the state's largest private employers with more than 1,000 employees.

Carlile Transportation
Cook Inlet Tug & Barge
Delta Western
Foss Maritime
Inlet Energy
Northern Air Cargo
Northern Air Maintenance Services (NAMS)
TOTE Maritime
Northern Oilfield Solutions
Alaska Petroleum Distributing
Naniq Global Logistics

Florida and the Caribbean

Saltchuk's operations in Florida and the Caribbean include service to 28 ports, including service from Jacksonville to Puerto Rico and scheduled and on-demand air cargo service throughout the Caribbean. Saltchuk companies employ more than 1,900 in the region.

 Shoreside Logistics
 StratAir
 TOTE Maritime (formerly Sea Star Lines)
Tropical Shipping

Hawaii 

Saltchuk acquired Young Brothers in 1999 and The Haynes Companies (Hawaii Petroleum companies) in 2006, expanding into energy distribution on Maui and the Big Island. In 2008, almost entirely due to the personal efforts of Senator Daniel Inouye, Saltchuk took over Aloha Airlines's cargo division after the airline went into bankruptcy.

Aloha Air Cargo
Hawaii Petroleum
Ohana Fuels
Maui Petroleum
Minit Stop stores
Young Brothers, Limited

References

External links

Aloha Air Cargo
Foss Marine
Northern Air Cargo
NorthStar Energy
Shoreside Logistics
TOTE 
Tropical Shipping

1982 establishments in Washington (state)
Family-owned companies of the United States
Logistics companies of the United States
Shipping companies of the United States
Transportation companies based in Washington (state)